The following is the discography of the American rock band the Doors. Formed in Los Angeles in 1965, the group consisted of Jim Morrison (vocals), Ray Manzarek (keyboards), John Densmore (drums), and Robby Krieger (guitar). The Doors became one of the most popular rock bands of their era. Their debut album, The Doors (1967), released by Elektra Records, charted at No. 2 on the US Billboard 200 and produced the group's most successful single, "Light My Fire". The album received several sales certifications including a four times multi-platinum from both the Recording Industry Association of America (RIAA), and from the Canadian Recording Industry Association (CRIA). The Doors' second studio album, Strange Days (1967), sold well commercially but did not reach the same level of success as the debut, and failed to produce a major hit single. It reached No. 3 on the Billboard 200 and was certified platinum in the United States and Canada. The Doors' third studio album Waiting for the Sun (1968), was very successful, reaching No. 1 in the US and France, and produced their second No. 1 single, "Hello, I Love You". Waiting for the Sun was the first Doors album to chart in the United Kingdom, where it peaked inside the Top 20. The album was certified gold in that country by the British Phonographic Industry (BPI), as well as being certified gold and platinum in several other countries.

For the fourth studio album The Soft Parade (1969), the Doors chose to incorporate string and brass instruments into a number of their songs. The band was criticized by many for this, and referred to as "pop sellouts" and having "gone soft". Despite this, The Soft Parade became the band's fourth straight Top 10 album and it produced their third most successful single, "Touch Me". The album was certified platinum in both the US and Canada. To counter the artistic criticism of their last two albums the Doors next released Morrison Hotel (1970). The blues-heavy LP was a critical and commercial success. Although only having produced one single, which did not perform well on the charts, Morrison Hotel became another Top 10 album for the band and was certified platinum in the US, Canada, and in France, by the Syndicat national de l'édition phonographique (SNEP). The group next released Absolutely Live (1970), a live album containing snippets of performances edited together from fourteen different concerts recorded in nine different cities in 1969 and 1970. Absolutely Live was well received and charted in the Top 10 in the US and Canada and was certified gold in both countries. L.A. Woman (1971), was the final Doors album with singer Jim Morrison, who died in Paris shortly after the album's release. The album was praised by critics and a commercial success, it landed inside the Top 10 in the US and Canada and produced two singles, "Love Her Madly" and "Riders on the Storm". Like Morrison Hotel before it, L.A. Woman relied very heavily on the blues, which was a genre of music the Doors had often incorporated into their early live sets while the house band at the London Fog, a nightclub on the Sunset Strip, in Los Angeles. L.A. Woman was certified gold and platinum in several different countries.

After the death of Morrison, the three remaining Doors members released two more studio albums before they eventually disbanded, Other Voices (1971), and Full Circle (1972). Both albums appeared on the US and Canadian albums charts, and likewise both produced charting singles, but the success was limited and the three sought solo ventures. Five years later, Manzarek, Krieger, and Densmore reunited to record backing tracks over Morrison's spoken word poetry, and released The Doors' ninth and final studio album titled, An American Prayer (1978). Morrison had recorded the poetry in separate sessions in 1969 and 1970. Upon release, the album received mixed reviews, but was commercially successful and was awarded platinum status in the US by the RIAA.

The use of the Doors song "The End", from their debut album, in the popular Vietnam War film, Apocalypse Now in 1979 and the release of the first compilation album in seven years, Greatest Hits, released in the fall of 1980, created a resurgence in the Doors. Due to those two events, an entirely new audience, too young to have known of the band earlier, began listening and purchasing the band's music. The group's popularity continued to increase. In the 1980s, the band released concert films, and live and compilation albums to much commercial success. In 1991, The Doors, a feature film about the band, directed by Academy Award winning director Oliver Stone, that starred Val Kilmer as Morrison, was released, which helped to expand the Doors' popularity to another audience. When You're Strange, is a 2009 documentary about The Doors written and directed by Tom DiCillo and narrated by Johnny Depp. It was nominated for an Emmy Award for Outstanding Nonfiction Series and won a Grammy Award for Best Long Form Video. The band continues to release compilations through Rhino Records and new live material through both Rhino and their Bright Midnight Archives label.

Albums

Studio albums

Notes
A:Australian chart positions for studio albums are as follows: Morrison Hotel, L.A. Woman, An American Prayer. Note: In Australia, albums and singles charting prior to 1974 were published by pop music newspaper Go-Set. All charts published subsequent to this date, until 1998, were the work of David Kent for the Kent Music Report.
B:Canadian chart positions for studio albums are as follows: The Doors, Waiting for the Sun, The Soft Parade, Morrison Hotel, L.A. Woman, Other Voices, Full Circle.
C:Did not appear on charts until 1991. In France, those noted as [C] first appeared on the charts in 1991, but achieved their peak status at a later date. The Doors peaked in 2002, Morrison Hotel in 2005, and L.A. Woman in 2003.
D:Canadian chart position for The Doors is most likely not a peak position but rather a re-entry position as this date is 19 months after the release of the album. Due to this being the earliest date that RPM "Top Albums" charts are published online by Library and Archives Canada, all "Top Albums" charts preceding this particular one are unavailable for viewing.
E:Did not appear on charts until 2005.
F:Strange Days most likely attained a charting position in Canada. The earliest RPM "Top Albums" chart available for viewing is 53 weeks after the release of Strange Days, consequently making any chart appearances the album may have had unknown.

Live albums

Archive albums

Compilation albums

Notes
G:Canadian chart positions for live albums are as follows: Absolutely Live, Alive, She Cried, Live at The Hollywood Bowl.
H:Canadian chart positions for compilation albums are as follows: 13, Weird Scenes Inside the Goldmine, The Doors Greatest Hits, The Doors: Original Soundtrack Recording.
I:This release also attained charting positions in the countries of Finland (9), Ireland (18).
J:This release also attained charting positions in the countries of Denmark (12), Finland (17), Ireland (4), Italy (9), Mexico (50), New Zealand (16), Portugal (4).
K:This release attained a charting position in the country of Greece (32).

Soundtracks

Box sets

L:This release also attained a charting position in the country of Italy (32).

Singles

Other charted songs

As featured artist

Notes
M:Australian chart positions for singles are as follows: "Light My Fire", "Touch Me", "You Make Me Real", "Love Her Madly", "Riders on the Storm".
N:Canadian chart positions for singles are as follows: "Light My Fire", "People Are Strange", "Love Me Two Times", "The Unknown Soldier", "Hello, I Love You", "Touch Me", "Wishful Sinful", "Tell All the People", "You Make Me Real", "Love Her Madly", "Riders on the Storm", "Tightrope Ride", "The Mosquito".
O:All charting positions for singles in New Zealand aside from "Break on Through (To the Other Side)", are from the New Zealand Listener and are not sales based music charts; rather, they were based on voting by NZ Listener readers. Chart positions are as follows: "Break on Through (To the Other Side)", "Light My Fire", "People Are Strange", "Hello, I Love You", "Touch Me", "Riders on the Storm".
P:In France, Break on Through (To the Other Side) did not appear on the charts until 1970, "Alabama Song (Whiskey Bar)" (1970), "Light My Fire (1971), "The End" (1980).
Q:Did not appear on charts until 1991.
R:"Light My Fire" peaked at No. 49 in the UK in 1967. The song attained its peak position of No. 7 in that country in 1991.
S:"Wishful, Sinful" peaked at No. 3 in Denmark.

Guest appearances

Videos

References

External links

Discography
Doors, The
Discographies of American artists